The 2007 Hawaii Warriors football team represented the University of Hawaii at Manoa in the 2007 NCAA Division I FBS football season.

The 2007 Warriors, led by record-setting senior quarterback Colt Brennan, carried a school-record 13-game winning streak, dating back to the end of the 2006 season, into the 2008 Sugar Bowl. The 2007 season marked the first undefeated regular season in school history, ending in defeat in the Sugar Bowl. The Warriors claimed their third-ever WAC championship in 2007 with a victory over defending conference champion Boise State. The championship was the school's first ever outright conference championship in football. Brennan went on to set more career records in the FBS, and the Warriors became the third team outside the BCS conferences and second from the WAC to receive an invitation to play in the Bowl Championship Series.

2006 season recap 
The 2006 Warriors tied the school record for most victories in a season with 11, with their only losses coming against Alabama in Tuscaloosa, an undefeated Boise State team that played in the Bowl Championship Series, and an Oregon State program that won ten games and finished the season nationally ranked. The Warriors finished in second place in the Western Athletic Conference behind Boise State and returned to the Hawaii Bowl after missing out on postseason play in 2005 due to a losing record. The Warriors defeated the Arizona State Sun Devils in the bowl game by a score of 41–24 to round out one of the school's most successful football seasons ever.

Assistant coach shuffle 

Waves were made in Hawaii during the months leading up to Spring practice. With the departures of Defensive Coordinator Jerry Glanville and Special Teams Coach Darrel "Mouse" Davis (the father of the run and shoot offense), the Warriors' most anticipated season took a slight detour.

On March 1, 2007, Glanville chose to accept the Head Coach position at Portland State University. It became apparent that he was seriously considering the position after staying in Portland an extra four days following his official interview. To harden the blow, Glanville offered Davis the Offensive Coordinator job at PSU. Davis was also the head coach for PSU in the '70s and '80s, where his run-and-shoot offense gained national attention. The silver lining on the dark cloud was that Davis wasn't the only one to benefit and there was another member of the coaching staff who prospered from this particular move. With two vacancies on the coaching staff, it made it possible for Offensive Line Coach Dennis McKnight to be promoted from an unpaid Graduate Assistant, to a salary-earning full-time assistant coach.

As for the other open position to be filled, it was believed that because of his experience and tremendous recruiting accomplishments, defensive line coach Jeff Reinebold was the obvious choice to become the next Defensive Coordinator. But shortly after Glanville's departure, talk of former Hawaii defensive coordinator Greg McMackin surfaced as a candidate for the job he held in 1999, June Jones' first season as Hawaii head coach. With the impressive, hard-hitting, 3–4 blitzing defense that Glanville put on the field in 2006 setting the standards ever-so-high, whoever was to inherit the job had big shoes to fill. The answer to whether Hawaii should remain a punishing 3–4 defense under Reinebold or return to a heavily blitzing 4–3 defense under McMackin that contributed to the biggest turnaround in NCAA college football history became slightly clearer when McMackin made an appearance as an "observer" to the first spring practice. The final confirmation came on April 5, when it was officially announced that Greg McMackin was named the defensive coordinator for Hawaii. Although his time at Hawaii was short, Glanville left a lasting impression on the fans as well as the players.

Schedule

Game summaries

Northern Colorado (Big Sky) 
Previous meeting: first ever meeting.
Heisman Trophy candidate Colt Brennan threw for 416 yards and six touchdowns in only the first half as the 23rd-ranked University of Hawai`i football team opened up the 2007 campaign with a 63–6 victory over Northern Colorado, Saturday night, at Aloha Stadium.
The Warriors found the end zone early and often tallying 28 points in the first and led 42–0 at the half. UH scored only once in the third quarter on an 80-yard punt return for a TD by Michael Washington.
The Bears finally got on the board with 10:22 remaining in the fourth as quarterback Mike Vlahogeorge took a quarterback draw and scampered five yards for the score. UH's Keenan Jones blocked the point after.
UH's Malcolm Lane then took the ensuing kickoff and sprinted 94 yards to make it 56–6. The UH defense picked off a pass and five plays later QB Inoki Funaki found Greg Salas for a 24-yard scoring strike to go up by 57, 63–6.
Brennan moved into a tie for sixth place on the NCAA career passing TD list with 99, sharing the spot with USC's Matt Leinart. He trails the No. 1 slot occupied by former BYU standout Ty Detmer by 22.
"Feels great to be back and the fans were awesome", Brennan said. "We had a great practice yesterday and knew in the hotel today that something felt right. I'm surrounded with a lot of veteran talent and that makes you better on offense and as a football player. They came out just like we had planned for. We were very prepared. I know that with our offensive line, they have a lot of motivation. I have a lot of trust in them."
The defense limited the Bear offense to a mere 182 yards of total offense.
Brennan was on fire in the first half, setting a new school record for completions in the first quarter (19) and half (34). He also broke his own record of passing yards in a half, finishing with 416 yards, 27 more than his previous mark of 389 set in last year's Hawai'i Bowl. Brennan also tied school marks for touchdowns in a quarter (4) and half (6).

Weekly accolades: AT&T All-America National Player of the Week & WAC Offensive Player of the Week: Colt Brennan, QB

Louisiana Tech (WAC) 

Previous meeting: Louisiana Tech 10 @ Hawaii 61 (2006)
Gerard Lewis batted down a two-point conversion to preserve a thrilling come-from-behind victory for the 20th ranked University of Hawai`i as the Warriors edged Louisiana Tech, 45–44, in overtime, Saturday night in the Western Athletic Conference season opener for both teams in front of 22,135 at Joe Aillet Stadium. Jason Rivers' 6-yard reception and Dan Kelly's extra-point kick proved to be just enough. Tech took their opening possession and countered with Dustin Mitchell going in from two yards out. Then the Bulldogs went for the win, but Lewis knocked down the 2-point pass attempt.
The Bulldogs went up 14–0 in the first quarter on a 2-yard run by Patrick Jackson. Then Jackson broke free for a 16-yard scamper with 4:03 left in the quarter.
The Warriors pulled to within seven when Leon Wright-Jackson scooted 47 yards up the middle with 1:43 remaining.
Hawai`i then knotted up the score when quarterback Colt Brennan plunged across from 1 yard out with 10:11 left in the second. Tech took a 21–14 lead into the half when Daniel Porter broke free from the line for an 18-yard run.
The Warriors struck first in the third quarter as Brennan found Ryan Grice-Mullen all alone for a 64-yard scoring strike.
Tech reclaimed the lead in the third on a 42-yard field goal by Danny Horwedel.
UH took its first lead of the game with 2:04 remaining in the third when Brennan connected with Grice-Mullen on a 17-yard pass.
After the UH defense held, a muffed handoff between Brennan and Wright-Jackson gave the Bulldogs back the ball late in the third. Tech then drove 33 yards on three plays, capped by a 3-yard touchdown pass by Zac Champion to Josh Wheeler to recapture the lead, 31–28.
The Warriors regained the lead, 35–31, on a Brennan 19-yard scoring strike to Davone Bess with 8:35 left in the game.
Tech converted a fourth and 1 from its 22 when Dennis Morris broke free for 21 yards to the UH 1. Morris then carried it across for the 1-yard score to give the Bulldogs a 38–35 lead.
Brennan finished with career-highs of 43 completions and 61 attempts for 548 yards and five touchdowns (four passing and one rushing). Brennan was 11 yards from his own school mark of 559 set during last year's Sheraton Hawai'i Bowl against Arizona State. Rivers finished the game with a school-record 14 receptions for 176 yards.

UNLV (MWC) 

Previous meeting: UNLV 13 @ Hawaii 42 (2006)
The 22nd-ranked University of Hawai`i football team ran its record to 3–0 on the season with a convincing 49–14 victory at UNLV in a non-conference game, Saturday night, in front of a sold out Sam Boyd Stadium.
Heisman Trophy candidate Colt Brennan was responsible for five touchdowns – three rushing and two passing. The senior quarterback, who played only the first three quarters, threw for 298 yards, completing 26 of 32 passes. Brennan snapped his 14-game 300+ yard passing streak, dating back to the UNLV match-up a year ago.
A crowd of 38,125 witnessed the Rebels (1–2) draw first blood manufacturing a 13-play, 79-yard drive, capped by a 6-yard run by Frank Summers.
UH responded with 42 unanswered points – 21 in the first half – to take a 14-point lead into halftime. The first two scores were 1-yard rushing touchdowns by Brennan. It was the quarterback's first multiple touchdown game on the ground. The third score was a 13-yard TD pass from Brennan to Ryan Grice-Mullen.
The Warriors kept the momentum in the second half. UH took the ball on its opening drive in the third and went 73 yards in seven plays before Brennan ran the option right and plunged over from 3 yards. In the series, Brennan completed an 11-yard pass to Leon Wright-Jackson to give him his 29th consecutive 200+ yard passing game, breaking the NCAA record. The old mark of 28 was held by Texas Tech's Kliff Kingsbury.
Hawai`i added two more scores in the quarter – a 2-yard TD pass from Brennan to Jason Rivers and a 40-yard interception return by Ryan Mouton – to give the Warriors a 42–7 lead heading into the fourth.
UNLV added a late score on a 31-yard touchdown run by Omar Clayton.
UH capped the scoring with its only touchdown in the fourth quarter as Tyler Graunke connected with Malcolm Lane on an 81-yard reception.

Charleston Southern (Big South) 
Previous meeting: first ever meeting

The 18th-ranked University of Hawai`i football team capitalized on a 28-point third quarter to knock off Charleston Southern, 66–10, Saturday night in a non-conference game in front of 37,723 at Aloha Stadium. The Warriors improved to 4–0 for the first time since the 1988 season.
UH scored on its opening possession when Tyler Graunke connected with C.J. Hawthorne on a 28-yard pass. Graunke got the starting nod when head coach June Jones held out Heisman Trophy candidate Colt Brennan for precautionary reasons.
Graunke finished the game, completing 22-of-36 attempts for 285 yards and three scores. The junior had career-highs in completions, attempts, yards, and touchdowns.
The Bucs tied it at 5:14 in the first when Eli Byrd hit Dee Brown on a 57-yard catch-and-run in the first quarter.
UH responded and scored 10 seconds into the second quarter when freshman Kealoha Pilares scooted 16 yards up the middle. The Warriors tacked on another seven late in the quarter as Graunke scrambled six yards for the score.
Charleston Southern's Nick Ellis kicked a 48-yard field goal to draw within 21–10 at the half.
It was all UH in the second half as the Warriors reeled off 45 straight points to turn an 11-point halftime lead into a 56-point rout. UH's Ryan Mouton took the second half kickoff 90 yards to the house. One minute later, linebacker Adam Leonard picked off Ellis' pass and returned it 36 yards for the touchdown. Graunke then hit receivers Davone Bess for a 19-yard score and Hawthorne on a 35-yard TD pass to close out the quarter.
UH tacked on 17 more in the fourth quarter behind backup quarterback Inoke Funaki. The sophomore from Kahuku High School hit Aaron Bain for a two-yard scoring reception with 13:16 left in the fourth quarter. Dan Kelly booted a 28-yard field goal at the 8:57 mark and Funaki then hit Michael Washington on a 19-yarder to wrap up the scoring.

Idaho (WAC) 

Previous meeting: Idaho 10 @ Hawaii 68 (2006)
The 17th-ranked University of Hawai`i football team kept its undefeated streak intact with a 48–20 victory over Idaho Saturday, in front of 13,807 at the Kibbie Dome.
UH ran its record to 5–0 on the season and 2–0 in Western Athletic Conference play. The Vandals fell to 1–4 and 0–1.
It is the first time UH had begun the season 5–0 since 1981. The win is the ninth WAC win in a row, setting a new school record.
Heisman Trophy candidate Colt Brennan, who sat out last week's win at home against Charleston Southern, threw for 369 yards and three touchdowns on 30-of-45 passing in this game. He also threw five interceptions, tying a school mark. Brennan extended his streak of consecutive games with at least one touchdown pass to 30 games. He has also thrown two or more TD passes in a game in 22 straight games.
In three career games versus Idaho, Brennan has 11 touchdown passes and 1,048 yards passing.
Hawai`i got on the board first as Brennan hooked up with Davone Bess on a 13-yard scoring strike.
Idaho tied it at seven on an Eddie Williams 18-yard run.
The Warriors then reeled off 31 unanswered points to take control of the game.
With 4:47 left in the first quarter, UH linebacker Adam Leonard picked off a pass and took it to the house. It was Leonard's second straight interception return for a touchdown in the last two games.
Brennan then connected with Malcolm Lane on a 41-yard touchdown pass. Later in the quarter, Brennan hit Bess with a 24-yard scoring pass. Dan Kelly hit a 39-yard field goal and defensive back Myron Newberry returned an interception 76 yards to give UH a 38–7 lead.
Idaho's Tino Amancio booted a 50-yard field goal with 36 seconds left before the half. But UH got a 21-yard kickoff return from Brashton Satele to the UH 49-yard line. Brennan then went to work completing four-straight passes to set up a 25-yard field goal by Kelly as time expired in the half.
Brennan scored the lone touchdown in the third quarter taking it in from 1-yard out.
Idaho added 10 points in the fourth quarter to cap the scoring.
UH did not score in the fourth quarter for the first time in 22-straight quarters.
UH receiver Bess posted season-highs in yards (162) and receptions (12). Linebacker Leonard led all Warrior defensive men with 10 total tackles.

Utah State (WAC) 

Previous meeting: Hawaii 63 @ Utah State 10 (2006)
The 15th-ranked University of Hawai'i football team won a shootout over Utah State, 52–37, Saturday night in a Western Athletic Conference match-up at Aloha Stadium. The Warriors improve to 6–0 and 3–0 in the WAC this season. UH quarterback Colt Brennan completed 19-of-25 for 219 yards and one touchdown before leaving the game early in the second half. The senior got dinged up on UH's final possession of the first half and succumbed to backup Tyler Graunke.
Graunke led the Warriors to a touchdown at the end of the first half and directed UH downfield on three drives in the second half. The junior from Tucson, Ariz., finished the game 9-of-11 for 246 yards and three touchdowns, including one rushing.
"I wasn't expecting to go in that early, but I was definitely mentally ready", Graunke said. "I took my fair share of reps during the week. Lately, I have not been feeling like me, it is taking me 1–2 series to get going, but tonight I got it going from the very first play. That start (Charleston Southern) gave me a lot of confidence. We executed very well and the receivers were just amazing. I knew I was over the goal line (on his second quarter touchdown) and that play gave us a lot of momentum heading into the second half."
The game featured big plays for both teams. Each team returned a kickoff for a touchdown and UH had three drives of three plays or less while USU had a one play drive.
Utah State (0–6, 0–2) got on the scoreboard on the game's opening possession with a 20-yard field goal by Peter Caldwell. The Warriors responded with an eight-play, 81-yard drive, culminating on a Kealoha Pilares touchdown from a yard out. That lead was short-lived as USU's Kevin Robinson returned the ensuing kickoff 100 yards giving the Aggies the lead back at 10–7.
UH knotted the game at 10 after Dan Kelly's 54-yard field goal, the fifth longest in school history. After Caldwell's 36-yard field goal gave the Aggies the lead temporarily at 13–10, Malcolm Lane's 87-yard return on the ensuing kickoff, put the Warriors on top for good, 17–13.
Following an Aggie punt, UH marched downfield and Brennan found Davone Bess on a 22-yard scoring strike. After UH's Josh Leonard recovered a USU fumble, Hawai'i drove the field for another touchdown. Graunke subbed in for Brennan and crossed the goal line with five seconds left giving UH a 31–13 halftime lead.
On their opening possession of the second half, the Aggies drove downfield on a 12 play drive and an eight-yard run by Derrvin Speight. Graunke connected with C.J. Hawthorne on two plays, including a 36-yarder for a 38–20 UH lead.
Graunke drove the Warriors again and found David Farmer on a 20-yard shuffle pass giving UH a 45–27 lead. On USU's next possession, Leon Jackson found Kevin Robinson on a 77-yard pass and catch but the Warriors responded just as quickly as Graunke connected with Rivers on a 72-yard reception.
Junior linebacker Soloman Elimimian led the Warrior defense with a career-high 20 tackles.
"Everyone played well", Elimimian said. "I just utilized my speed tonight and tried to go from sideline to sideline. I'd give the Defense a "C" tonight. We definitely could have played better, 37 points are just too much. Guys can't do what they want to do, it's a team concept. Teams like Utah State are much tougher to beat than a ranked team because they played with nothing to lose."

San Jose State (WAC) 

Previous meeting: San Jose State 17 @ Hawaii 54 (2006)
The 16th ranked University of Hawai`i football team rallied past San Jose State, 42–35, in overtime in a Western Athletic Conference contest in front of 20,473 at a rain-drenched Spartan Stadium. Jason Rivers caught a 9-yard touchdown pass from Colt Brennan in the first overtime for its second come-from-behind victory this season. Defensive back Myron Newberry sealed the win intercepting SJSU quarterback Adam Tafralis in the end zone on the final drive.
Hawai`i improves to 7–0 on the season and 4–0 in WAC play, while San Jose State falls to 3–4 and 2–1. With the win, UH extends its win streak to eight and keeps its hope for a BCS bid alive. The Warriors also extended their WAC win streak to 11 games.
Heisman Trophy candidate Brennan completed 44-of-75 passes for 545 yards and four TD passes. He also was picked four times during the game. It was the third time this season a trio of receivers went for at least 100 yards or more led by Ryan Grice-Mullen's 14 catches for 175 yards. Bess and Rivers posted 140 and 138 yards, respectively.
It was the first time this season UH failed to score at least 45 points and but kept its streak of 17-straight games scoring 32 points or more.
UH opened the scoring after linebacker Adam Leonard picked off a Spartan pass and returned it 28 yards to the SJSU 35 yard line. Brennan then connected on 4-of-6 passes to set up a Kealoha Pilares 6-yard rush to give UH a 7–0 lead.
Hawai`i then manufactured a 12-play drive, 86-yard drive culminating with a 16-yard touchdown pass from Brennan to Grice-Mullen.
San Jose State cut the deficit in half when Dwight Lowery returned a Tim Grasso punt 84 yards just before the end of the first half.
SJSU's Lowery then picked off Brennan's first attempt of the third quarter and returned it 24 yards to knot it up at 14 apiece.
The Spartans took their first lead of the game with 5:25 left in the third when Tafralis hit Kevin Jurovich on a 16-yard pass. The play capped a five-play, 65-yard drive after SJSU took over on downs when Brennan was stopped on a fourth and 1 quarterback sneak. It is the first time since the Louisiana Tech game that UH has trailed at all in the second half.
SJSU extended its lead to 28–14 with Tafralis hitting Jurovich on a 68-yard scoring strike with 2:32 remaining in the third.
UH didn't waste any time, marching down the field 67 yards in one minute and 18 seconds. The TD cut into SJSU's lead with Brennan tossing a 34-yard strike to C.J. Hawthorne to pull to within seven, 28–21. The TD gave Brennan the NCAA record for touchdowns responsible for in a 3-year span.
SJSU took the ensuing kickoff and traveled 65 yards on eight plays with James T. Callier taking the pitch and going around the right side for an 8-yard TD.
UH scored with 3:53 left in the fourth quarter when Davone Bess caught an 11-yard over the shoulder catch from Brennan.
SJSU took over but James T. Callier coughed up the ball after a huge blow from linebacker Blaze Soares with Leonard recovering the fumble with 2:56 left in the game.
It took the Warriors only two minutes and 25 seconds to drive down the field 45 yards with Brennan taking the option and going across the right side for a 2-yard run to tie the game with 31 seconds left, 35–35.
The Spartans had one last chance to score before the end of regulation, but the UH defense held strong as time expired.
Defensively, Leonard led the charge with 11 tackles, two for a loss, one fumble recovery and one interception. Solomon Elimimian and Jacob Patek recorded eight and seven tackles, respectively.

New Mexico State (WAC) 

Previous meeting: Hawaii 49 @ New Mexico State 30 (2006)
The 14th-ranked University of Hawai`i football team defeated New Mexico State, 50–13, Saturday night, in a Western Athletic Conference game in front of a season-high 41,218 on Homecoming at Aloha Stadium. Hawai`i improves to 8–0 on the year and 5–0 in the WAC, while New Mexico State falls to 4–5 and 1–3. The 8–0 start marks the best for UH since 1973 and are one of only five undefeated teams in the country.
Heisman Trophy candidate Colt Brennan became the school's all-time career touchdown leader after throwing six against the Aggies. He has 119 in his career and surpassed Timmy Chang's previous mark of 117. In addition, Brennan ranks second all-time in NCAA and WAC history and trails former BYU quarterback Ty Detmer's record of 121.
"I was obviously happy with the result, but we're going to have to play better the next few games", UH head coach June Jones said. "Colt was not at his best tonight, but six touchdowns is still pretty good. I hope the week off gets him and the team healthy and ready for Fresno."
After tossing an interception on his first pass attempt, Brennan drove the Warriors 65 yards in five plays, hitting Jason Rivers on a 16-yard touchdown pass to put UH on top 6–0. Place kicker Dan Kelly missed the extra-point attempt, snapping his streak of 50 straight this season and 69 consecutive over the past two years.
Brennan finished the game completing 29-of-46 for 425 yards. He surpassed the 400-yard mark for the fourth time this season and the 17th time in his career.
"What I learned last year is that don't pay any attention to records or stats", Brennan said. "This offense and this team is not about that but about the 'W' – that is our mentality."
Hawai`i struck again in the first quarter as Brennan found Ryan Grice-Mullen on a fade route in the left corner of the end zone to put UH up 13–0.
In the second quarter, Myron Newberry returned a short NMSU punt 29 yards to the Aggie 12 to set up a 27-yard field goal by Kelly. The UH defense held the Aggies on a fourth-and-three at the UH 47, then two plays later Brennan hooked up with Grice-Mullen down the right sideline for a 42-yard score to make it 23–0.
The Aggies' Paul Young added a 34-yard field goal as UH went into the locker room with a 23–3 halftime lead.
NMSU scored on its opening possession of the second half, marching 58 yards on 11 plays, capped by a 41-yard field goal by Young.
UH took the ensuing kickoff and drove 61 yards in five plays with Brennan completing a 23-yard scoring pass to Davone Bess. The TD pass by Brennan was his 117th of his career, tying him with Chang.
The Aggies reached the end zone for the first time on their next possession as Chase Holbrook hit Wes Neiman on a 19-yard score.
Brennan became UH's all-time leader on the Warriors' next possession when he hit Grice-Mullen on an 11-yard score. Brennan then orchestrated a 10-play, 95-yard drive with 6:56 left in the fourth quarter, connecting with Bess on a 12-yard pass play for a 43–13 Warrior lead.
UH defensive back JoPierre Davis picked off Holbrook late in the fourth quarter and returned it 57 yards for the final margin.
Grice-Mullen finished the game with a career-high 195 yards receiving while Bess tied the UH mark for career touchdowns after reaching the endzone twice. He now has 38, tying him with former UH quarterback Michael Carter and receiver Chad Owens.
"If you ask me during the game, I never know the numbers" Grice-Mullen said. "I may know how many touchdowns. My objective is to just go out and play the game and get a win. We've been in the system 3 or 4 years now with the same quarterback and things are becoming second nature and go out and have fun."

Fresno State (WAC/Rivalry) 

Previous meeting: Hawaii 68 @ Fresno State 37 (2006)

The University of Hawai`i moved to 9–0 for the first time since the 1925 season with a 37–30 victory against Fresno State in a Western Athletic Conference game in front of 49,047 fans at Aloha Stadium. Quarterback Colt Brennan tied two NCAA Division I career touchdown records in the game.
Brennan tied Brigham Young's Ty Detmer for most career touchdown passes (121) and most career touchdowns responsible for (135) with two passing and one rushing scores against the Bulldogs.
The Warriors (9–0, 6–0 WAC) are one of only two undefeated teams remaining in the Football Bowl Subdivision (formerly Division I). UH extended their win streak to 10 games, tied with Kansas for the longest current streak in the country.
Lightning struck quickly as Brennan hit wide receiver Jason Rivers on a 67-yard post pattern on the third play of the game to put the Warriors up 7–0. Brennan finished the game completing 28-of-39 passes for 396 yards and two touchdowns before leaving the game in the fourth quarter.
"I'm glad we could get the win", head coach June Jones said. "We started off pretty good and then got ourselves in a football game. (Colt) is fine. He'll be ready for the next game."
On UH's next possession, Brennan drove the offense down the field 83 yards on eight plays, capped by a 33-yard run by Leon Wright-Jackson. Brennan called his own number on UH's third possession from three yards out to lead 21–0. However, Bulldog A.J. Jefferson took the ensuing kickoff and returned it 98 yards to pull to within 14.
UH's Dan Kelly put the Warriors back on top by 17 splitting the uprights with a 25-yard field goal the next time UH had the ball.
Brennan then connected with Davone Bess on a 5-yard crossing route that gave UH a commanding 31–7 lead at the 11:26 mark in the second quarter. That TD pass by Brennan tied him with former Brigham Young quarterback Ty Detmer at 121 career TD passes for a share of the all-time NCAA Division IA career TD passing mark.
Fresno State (6–4, 5–2) added a 28-yard field goal by Clint Stitser to trim the deficit to 31–10 with 4:33 remaining in the second.
After recovering a fumble at the UH 26, the Bulldogs drove a short field with FSU quarterback Tom Brandstater finding Isaac Kinter in the back of the end zone for a 6-yard score. The extra point went wide right to pull FSU to within 31–16 with 37 seconds left in the second.
UH then drove 53 yards in 35 seconds to set up a 50-yard field goal by Kelly to take a 34–16 lead into the half.
After a scoreless third quarter, the Warriors opened up the fourth with Kelly booting his third field goal of the evening, a 24-yarder.
The Bulldogs took the kickoff and traveled 85 yards in five plays with Brandstater hooking up with wide receiver Marlon Moore on a 31-yard touchdown reception.
"Anytime we play Fresno, it is a tough game", linebacker Adam Leonard said. "Pat Hill's team is a run first and we knew they would have an attitude and not let up. We were fortunate to come out with a win."
Brennan left the game at the 10:43 mark after taking a head-on collision with FSU linebacker Marcus Riley.
"I'm doing fine", Brennan said after the game. "I'd like to thank everyone for the support they gave out there. I'm looking forward to getting back on the field for next week's game against Nevada."
The Bulldogs added a late score. UH recovered the onside kick and ran the clock out.

Nevada (WAC) 

Previous meeting: Nevada 34 @ Hawaii 41 (2006)
Dan Kelly's 45-yard field goal with 11 seconds left lifted No. 12 Hawai'i past Nevada, 28–26, in a Western Athletic Conference game in front of 22,437 at Mackey Stadium tonight.
Hawai'i got the ball back with 2:16 remaining in the fourth quarter, trailing 26–25. Quarterback Tyler Graunke marched the Warriors 61 yards in 11 plays to set up Kelly's heroics.
The Wolf Pack tried to ice the junior kicker twice. UNR called a timeout just before the snap on the first try as Kelly's kick split the uprights. The kicker and special teams personnel regrouped and duplicated the feat once more, this time it counted.
Nevada had one last chance but the hail mary attempt was intercepted by Jacob Patek on the final play of the game.
The Warriors extended their win streak to 11-game, tying the longest in school history. UH also finished 5–0 on the road this season and extended their road win streak to eight straight dating back to last season. Lastly, the Warriors extended their WAC win streak to 14 games.
Heisman Trophy candidate Colt Brennan did not start the game. Instead, Graunke got the nod. Head Coach June Jones rotated the two quarterbacks along with Inoke Funaki on the opening drive.
The Warriors (10–0, 7–0 WAC), who won in Reno for the first time in four tries, took the opening kickoff and drove 50 yards in 11 plays, capped by a Kelly 45-yard field goal.
After UH punter Tim Grasso pinned Nevada at their own 3 yard line, defensive lineman David Veikune sacked Wolf Pack quarterback Colin Kaepernick in the endzone to give UH a 5–0 lead and its first safety of the season.
UH made it 12–0 after sustaining another long drive of 64 yards highlighted by a 3-yard touchdown pass from Graunke to Jason Rivers.
Nevada (5–5, 3–3 WAC) cut the deficit to 12–7 after Kaepernick hit Luke Lippincott on a 7-yard scoring strike.
Graunke then orchestrated a four-play 80-yard drive with the quarterback calling his own number from 7-yards out. A 53-yard pass play from Graunke to C.J. Hawthorne on the first play of the drive set up the touchdown.
The Wolf Pack responded with a 41-yard field goal by Brett Jaekle to go into the locker room at halftime with UH out in front, 19–10.
Nevada took the second half kickoff and traveled 52 yards with Jaekle booting his second field goal of the game, a 42-yarder.
The Wolf Pack took its first lead of the game, 20–19, on their next possession with a 17-play drive covering 90 yards elapsing eight minutes and 20 seconds with Kaepernick bootlegging over from three yards out.
UH recaptured the lead, 25–20, as Graunke connected with Ryan Grice-Mullen for a 22-yard scoring strike. The Warriors went for two, but Graunke's attempt was batted down.
After both teams exchanged punts, Nevada then put together a 51-yard drive highlighted by a 45-yard pass play before Lippincott plunged over the left side from 5 yards. The two-point pass attempt was no good giving the Wolf Pack a slim, 26–25 lead with 8:27 left in the fourth quarter.
On UH's next possession, Graunke was sacked and fumbled the ball giving Nevada good position from the UH 44-yard line. Two plays later, defensive lineman Keala Watson popped UNR wide receiver Arthur King Jr. and made him cough up the ball with Watson recovering at the UH 47.
The Warriors were stopped on a fourth down play when Graunke tried to thread it to Rivers on the left sideline.
The UH defense held Nevada's offense and forced them to punt to give UH one last try.

Boise State (Rivalry) 

Previous meeting: Hawaii 34 @ #25 Boise State 41 (2006)

The 13th-ranked University of Hawai'i football team claimed its first outright Western Athletic Conference championship after a 39–27 victory over No. 17 Boise State, Friday night, at a sold-out, raucous crowd at 50,000-seat Aloha Stadium. The win keeps the Warriors' (11–0, 8–0 WAC) hopes alive of a Bowl Championship Series game.
Hawai'i snapped Boise State's streak of 18 straight WAC wins and a six-game losing streak to the Broncos (10–2, 7–1). It also snapped BSU's stranglehold of the conference title, ending the Broncos five-year reign. The victory extended UH's win streak to a new school-record 12 straight.
UH also captured WAC championships in 1992 and 1999, however, those were shared with other teams.
Heisman Trophy candidate Colt Brennan led the Warrior aerial attack with 495 yards and five touchdowns, while also rushing for another score. Brennan broke three major college records following his first TD of the night to Ryan Grice-Mullen, breaking Ty Detmer's mark for most career touchdowns, most TDs responsible for and most points responsible for.
"I think we proved something tonight with all of the so-called experts who picked Boise to beat us", Brennan said. "It was a great win for us, the school and the state. The faith on this team is huge. We believe in ourselves."
Receiver Davone Bess set a new school record with 15 receptions for 181 yards and two touchdowns. With the two scores, he and Brennan tied the NCAA mark for passing combinations with 39 career TDs. Jason Rivers had 11 catches for 113 yards and one touchdown. C.J. Hawthorne had 111 yards and one score.
Friday's contest was a match-up between two of the nation's top offensive teams. Coming into the game, Hawai'i was No. 1 in the country averaging 48.0 points per game and third at 523.9 yards per contest. Boise State, meanwhile, was third with 44.2 points and 10th at 488.7 yards. The Warriors finished the game with 574 yards of total offense and held the Broncos to a season-low 101 yards rushing.
UH also limited BSU star running back Ian Johnson to 86 yards on the ground. Following a 50-yard dash which put the Broncos up 7–0, the Warrior defense allowed only 19 yards the rest of the game to the Heisman hopeful.
"I was a little concerned early when we had the special teams breakdowns", UH head coach June Jones said. "But I'm very proud of the kids. They battled through a lot of adversity and hung in there." I'm very happy for the state of Hawai'i."
After matching the Broncos score with Brennan's record-breaking TD to Grice-Mullen, Hawai'i responded with a 95-yard, seven-play drive, ending in a Brennan keeper from one-yard out. The PAT was blocked, one of two blocked extra points by the Broncos on the night.
BSU responded on its next drive, retaking the lead, 14–13. The Broncos traveled 69 yards on 11 plays with Johnson taking the pitch and going over the right side for a 1-yard score.
Hawai'i answered the score with Brennan orchestrating an eight-play drive encompassing 67 yards hitting Bess on a 23-yard scoring strike for a 19–14 lead. The Broncos pulled to within two at the half with a 39-yard field goal by Kyle Brotzman.
The Warriors took the opening drive of the second half as Brennan completed all six of his attempts for 70 yards with the last 22 going to Bess on a flair to the left flats for a 26–17 lead.
"I think by us putting it in the endzone on the first drive, it got everyone pumped up", Jones said.
The Broncos scored 10 straight on a six-yard pass from Tayor Tharp to Rickie Brockel and a Brotzman 36-yard field goal after Brennan was picked for the second time in the game. But that was BSU's last lead as the Warriors scored on consecutive drives to end the third quarter.
Brennan led the Warriors downfield on 10 plays and 70 yards, culminating on a seven-yard stop route to Rivers for a 32–27 lead. After forcing the Broncos to punt, Brennan then completed consecutive passes of 19 and 28 yards to running back Kealoha Pilares and Bess, respectively, before finally hooking up with Hawthorne on a 38-yard toss.
Neither team scored in the final period. As UH ran out the clock, fans stormed the field in celebration while the team was awarded the WAC Championship trophy by commissioner Karl Benson.
"I told everyone that after eight games, the final four would be the determining factor", Jones said. "We got three, we need one more."

Weekly accolades: WAC Players of the week: QB Colt Brennan (offensive player of the week) and Solomon Elimimian (defensive player of the week).

Washington (Pac-10) 

Previous meeting: Hawaii  10 @ Washington 7 (1973)

The University of Hawai`i football team (12–0, 8–0 Western Athletic Conference) completed an undefeated regular season by rallying past Washington, 35–28, Saturday night at sold-out Aloha Stadium. A raucous crowd watched the Warriors erase a 21-point first half deficit and score the game's final 28 points.
Heisman Trophy candidate Colt Brennan completed 42-of-50 for 442 yards and five touchdowns, four to wideout Jason Rivers, who also grabbed 14 receptions for 167 yards.
After the Warriors tied the game at 28, Brennan led the game-winning drive, ending with a 5-yard touchdown pass to Ryan Grice-Mullen with 44 seconds left.
"What a win", exclaimed UH head coach June Jones. "(The team) was committed to getting a win tonight. They played hard and I can't be more proud of them. It's unbelievable. The (regular season) could not have ended better."
UW (4–9, 2–7 Pac-10) scored on its first three possessions in the game's first 10 minutes. The first two scores were aided by a UH illegal substitution penalty and a UH fumble. Quarterback Jake Locker scored on an 8-yard run followed by Luke Kravitz's 1-yard plunge. It was Kravitz again finding the endzone from two yards out to make it 21–0. UH fumbled the ball over to UW three times in the opening quarter.
The Warriors finally got on the scoreboard with 10:17 left in the second with Brennan hooking up with Rivers on a 7-yard pass to cut the deficit to 21–7. But UW took the ensuing kickoff and traveled 84 yards capped by Paul Homer diving over from a yard out.
UH made it a 14-point game as Brennan connected again with Rivers on a 3-yard scoring pass. Brennan completed all five of his passes accounting for the 75 yard-drive.
Hawai'i pulled to within seven just before the half when Rivers caught his third touchdown from Brennan, a 13-yarder. Originally, the catch was ruled incomplete, but it was overturned after the review. Brennan completed his final 17 passes of the half, breaking the UH record of 16 set by Jason Whieldon in 2003.
Neither team scored in the third quarter. UW had a chance, but Ryan Perkins' 38-yard field goal was blocked by Joshua Leonard. The Warriors tied it at 28 when Brennan hit Rivers on a 40-yard streak pass at the 8:01 mark in the fourth.
The UH defense came up big in the fourth aided by a huge penalty when Locker passed the line of scrimmage to throw what would have been a first down. Instead, the penalty was tacked on and a loss of down forcing UW to punt and setting up UH's game-winning drive.
The drive started at their own 24 and the Warriors marched downfield in eight plays covering 76 yards capped by a five-yard pass to Grice-Mullen with 44 seconds left.
"Coach Jones trusted me on that last call", Brennan said. "I told coach 'we got 'em' so I changed it to a pass play because I knew they were going to be in man. I've got the most talented receiving corps in the nation."
The Huskies weren't done just yet. Locker completed a 25-yarder to Michael Gottlieb and a 49-yard bomb to Marcel Reece to the UH four. Two plays later, Locker's pass was deflected by Gerard Lewis and picked off by Ryan Mouton setting off a wild celebration.

Weekly accolades: QB Colt Brennan is named the University of Hawaii's most valuable player, WAC's offensive player of the year, and named as a 2007 Heisman Trophy finalist. WR Jason Rivers is named WAC's offensive player of the week. Head Coach June Jones is named WAC's coach of the year and named as a 2007 Eddie Robinson Award finalist.

Post Season: 2008 BCS Allstate Sugar Bowl

Georgia (SEC) 

Previous meeting: first ever meeting.

The 2008 Allstate Sugar Bowl Game was an American college football bowl game.  It was part of the Bowl Championship Series (BCS) for the 2007 NCAA Division I FBS football season, and was the 74th Sugar Bowl.  It was played on January 1, 2008, in the Louisiana Superdome in New Orleans.

Because the SEC champion (LSU) was slated to participate in the BCS National Championship Game, the number-five Georgia Bulldogs were selected to host the number-ten, WAC champion Hawaii Warriors, the last undefeated major college football team going into the bowl season.

The Warriors were only the third team not in any of the six BCS conferences (not counting major independent Notre Dame) to play in a BCS game.  Boise State qualified for the 2007 Fiesta Bowl, and Utah made the same game two years earlier.  Both teams won their respective games.

Scoring Summary 

Pre-game
Hawaii wins the toss, selects to receive.

First Quarter
UGA Touchdown, by Knowshon Moreno, rush for 17 yards. Brandon Coutu makes PAT. (9:49) 7–0 UGA
UH Field goal, by Dan Kelly, 42 yards. (4:26) 7–3 UGA
UGA Touchdown, by Moreno, rush for 11 yards. Coutu makes PAT. (1:02) 14–3 UGA

Second Quarter
UGA Field goal, by Coutu, 52 yards. (9:36) 17–3 UGA
UGA Touchdown, 11-yard pass from Matthew Stafford to Sean Bailey, Coutu makes PAT. (8:05) 24–3 UGA

Third Quarter
UGA Fumble recovery, touchdown by Marcus Howard. Coutu makes PAT. (8:57) 31–3 UGA
UGA Touchdown, by Thomas Brown, 1 yard rush. Coutu makes PAT. (1:40) 38–3 UGA

Fourth Quarter
UGA Field goal, by Coutu, 45 yards. (14:37) 41–3 UGA
UH Touchdown, pass from Tyler Graunke to Ryan Grice-Mullen, 16 yards. PAT made by Dan Kelly. (10:38) 41–10 UGA

Aftermath 
With Hawaii's defeat, the 2007–08 college football season ended with no undefeated teams, something that had not happened since the 2003–04 season.  This is also the second time in the BCS era that this has occurred.

It also began a streak of three straight bowl game losses for Hawaii, a streak that has continued as of 2016. After this season, Hawaii was 40–64, and their lone winning season was also 2010.

Georgia DE Marcus Howard was named the MVP of the Sugar Bowl Game, the first time in its history that a purely defensive player has received the honor.

With the win, Georgia Head Coach Mark Richt became the first head coach in Georgia history to win more than one Sugar Bowl (his previous victory was over Florida State University following the 2002 season).  Vince Dooley and Wally Butts won one Sugar Bowl each, with Dooley's only win securing the 1980 National Championship.  Dooley lost four other Sugar Bowl games.

On January 8, Hawaii Head Coach June Jones left Hawaii to become the head coach at Southern Methodist University.  He signed a five-year contract.

Rankings

By the numbers

Statistics 
 QB Colt Brennan: 359/510 (70.4%) for 4,343 yards and 38 TD vs. 17 INT. 82 carries for 27 yards and 8 TD.
 QB Tyler Graunke: 90/137 (65.7%) for 1,234 yards and 10 TD vs. 6 INT. 21 carries for 11 yards and 3 TD.
 RB Kealoha Pilares: 68 carries for 388 yards and 3 TD. 26 catches for 249 yards and 1 TD.
 RB Leon Wright-Jackson: 33 carries for 219 yards and 2 TD. 16 catches for 146 yards and 0 TD.
 WR Ryan Grice-Mullen: 106 catches for 1,372 yards and 13 TD.
 WR Davone Bess: 108 catches for 1,266 yards and 12 TD.
 WR Jason Rivers: 92 catches for 1,174 yards and 13 TD.
 WR C.J. Hawthorne: 61 catches for 859 yards and 6 TD.
 WR Malcolm Lane: 14 catches for 270 yards and 2 TD.

Roster 

Mario Cox: Dismissed from the team on October 30, 2007.  He had played in five games this season. more

Coaching staff

References 

Hawaii
Hawaii Rainbow Warriors football seasons
Western Athletic Conference football champion seasons
Hawaii Warriors football